Mark Spencer may refer to:
Mark Spencer (botanist), British forensic botanist
Mark Spencer (computer engineer) (born 1977), American computer engineer
Mark Spencer (guitarist) (born 1957), American guitarist
Mark Spencer (British politician) (born 1970), British Member of Parliament for Sherwood
Mark Spencer (New York politician) (1787–1859), New York politician

See also
Marks & Spencer, a major British retailer
Spencer (surname)